Stereo image may refer to:

 Stereogram, an image intended to give a 3-dimensional visual impression
 The impression of localization of sound source in stereo imaging